Erwood station may refer to:

 Erwood railway station
 Erwood transmitting station